Hogna is a genus of wolf spiders with more than 200 described species. It is found on all continents except Antarctica.

Etymology 
The word Hogna might be a rough latinization of one of the Greek words ὄχνη (ókhnē) "pear" or ὄγχνη (ónkhnē) "pear-tree".

Species 

The carapace of H. carolinensis is characterized by an overall dark brown coloration, usually without any patterned variations. Its abdomen has a slightly darker stripe down its center, and its ventral side is black. This spider typically dwells in a vertical tube dug into the ground that may reach as deep as eight inches.

, the World Spider Catalog accepted the following species:

Hogna ackermanni Logunov, 2020 – Afghanistan
Hogna adjacens Roewer, 1959 – Southern Africa
Hogna agadira (Roewer, 1960) – Morocco
Hogna albemarlensis (Banks, 1902) – Galapagos Islands
Hogna alexandria (Roewer, 1960) – Egypt
Hogna ammophila (Wallace, 1942) – USA
Hogna andreinii Reimoser, 1937 – Ethiopia
Hogna angusta (Tullgren, 1901) – USA
Hogna antelucana (Montgomery, 1904) – USA
Hogna antiguiana Roewer, 1955 – Antigua
Hogna archaeologica (Chamberlin, 1925) – Mexico
Hogna argentinensis (Mello-Leitão, 1941) – Argentina
Hogna atramentata (Karsch, 1879) – Central, East Africa
Hogna auricoma (Keyserling, 1891) – Brazil
Hogna badia (Keyserling, 1877) – Cuba, Central America
Hogna balearica (Thorell, 1873) – Balearic Islands
Hogna baliana Roewer, 1959 – Cameroon
Hogna baltimoriana (Keyserling, 1877) – USA, Canada
Hogna bellatrix (L. Koch, 1865) – Australia
Hogna beniana (Strand, 1913) – Central, East Africa
Hogna bergsoei (Thorell, 1875) – Russia, Central Asia
Hogna bhougavia Roewer, 1960 – Afghanistan
Hogna bicoloripes (Roewer, 1960) – Cameroon
Hogna bimaculata (Purcell, 1903) – South Africa
Hogna birabeni (Mello-Leitão, 1938) – Argentina
Hogna bivittata (Mello-Leitão, 1939) – Argentina
Hogna blackwalli (Johnson, 1862) – Madeira
Hogna bonifacioi Barrion & Litsinger, 1995 – Philippines
Hogna bottegoi Caporiacco, 1940 – Ethiopia
Hogna bowonglangi (Merian, 1911) – Sulawesi
Hogna brevitarsis (F. O. Pickard-Cambridge, 1902) – Mexico to Panama
Hogna brunnea (Bösenberg, 1895) – Canary Islands
Hogna bruta (Karsch, 1880) – Polynesia
Hogna burti (Hickman, 1944) – South Australia
Hogna canariana (Roewer, 1960) – Canary Islands
Hogna carolinensis (Walckenaer, 1805) – USA, Mexico
Hogna chickeringi (Chamberlin & Ivie, 1936) – Panama
Hogna cinica (Tongiorgi, 1977) – St. Helena
Hogna coloradensis (Banks, 1894) – USA, Mexico
Hogna colosii (Caporiacco, 1947) – Guyana
Hogna commota (Gertsch, 1934) – Colombia
Hogna conspersa (L. Koch, 1882) – Balearic Islands
Hogna constricta (F. O. Pickard-Cambridge, 1902) – Guatemala
Hogna cosquin (Mello-Leitão, 1941) – Argentina
Hogna crispipes (L. Koch, 1877) – Australia (mainland, Norfolk Is.), New Guinea, Vanuatu, Polynesia, New Zealand
Hogna dauana Roewer, 1959 – Ethiopia
Hogna defucata Roewer, 1959 – Congo
Hogna denisi Roewer, 1959 – South Africa
Hogna deweti Roewer, 1959 – South Africa
Hogna diyari Framenau, Gotch & Austin, 2006 – Queensland, New South Wales, South Australia
Hogna duala Roewer, 1959 – Cameroon
Hogna effera (O. Pickard-Cambridge, 1872) – Greece (Crete), Cyprus, Turkey, Egypt, Israel, Lebanon, Syria, Yemen (Sokotra), Saudi Arabia, United Arab Emirates, Iraq, Iran
Hogna efformata Roewer, 1959 – Namibia
Hogna electa Roewer, 1959 – Tanzania
Hogna enecens Roewer, 1959 – Kenya
Hogna ericeticola (Wallace, 1942) – USA
Hogna espanola Baert & Maelfait, 2008 – Galapagos Islands
Hogna estrix Roewer, 1959 – Namibia
Hogna etoshana Roewer, 1959 – Namibia
Hogna exigua (Roewer, 1960) – Namibia
Hogna exsiccatella (Strand, 1916) – Guatemala
Hogna felina (L. Koch, 1878) – Azerbaijan
Hogna ferocella (Strand, 1916) – Canary Islands
Hogna ferox (Lucas, 1838) – Canary Islands, Mediterranean
Hogna filicum (Karsch, 1880) – Polynesia
Hogna flava Roewer, 1959 – Namibia
Hogna forsteri Caporiacco, 1955 – Venezuela
Hogna fraissei (L. Koch, 1882) – Mallorca
Hogna frondicola (Emerton, 1885) – USA, Canada
Hogna furva (Thorell, 1899) – Sierra Leone, Cameroon, Equatorial Guinea (Bioko)
Hogna furvescens (Simon, 1910) – Botswana
Hogna gabonensis Roewer, 1959 – Gabon
Hogna galapagoensis (Banks, 1902) – Galapagos Islands
Hogna graeca (Roewer, 1951) – Greece
Hogna gratiosa Roewer, 1959 – Zanzibar
Hogna grazianii (Caporiacco, 1939) – Ethiopia
Hogna gumia (Petrunkevitch, 1911) – Bolivia
Hogna guttatula (F. O. Pickard-Cambridge, 1902) – Mexico
Hogna hawaiiensis (Simon, 1899) – Hawaii
Hogna heeri (Thorell, 1875) – Madeira
Hogna hendrickxi Baert & Maelfait, 2008 – Galapagos Islands
Hogna hereroana (Roewer, 1960) – Namibia
Hogna hibernalis (Strand, 1906) – Ethiopia
Hogna hickmani Caporiacco, 1955 – Venezuela
Hogna hippasimorpha (Strand, 1913) – Central Africa
Hogna idonea Roewer, 1959 – South Africa
Hogna indefinida (Mello-Leitão, 1941) – Argentina
Hogna inexorabilis (O. Pickard-Cambridge, 1869) – St. Helena
Hogna infulata Roewer, 1959 – South Africa
Hogna ingens (Blackwall, 1857) – Madeira
Hogna inhambania Roewer, 1955 – Mozambique
Hogna inominata (Simon, 1886) – Thailand
Hogna inops (Thorell, 1890) – Sumatra, Borneo, Sulawesi
Hogna insulana (L. Koch, 1882) – Mallorca
Hogna insularum (Kulczyński, 1899) – Madeira
Hogna interrita Roewer, 1959 – Zimbabwe
Hogna irascibilis (O. Pickard-Cambridge, 1885) – Turkmenistan
Hogna irumua (Strand, 1913) – Central Africa
Hogna isambertoi Crespo, 2022 – Madeira
Hogna jacquesbreli Baert & Maelfait, 2008 – Galapagos Islands
Hogna jiafui Peng et al., 1997 – China
Hogna juanensis (Strand, 1907) – Mozambique
Hogna junco Baert & Maelfait, 2008 – Galapagos Islands
Hogna kabwea Roewer, 1959 – Congo
Hogna kankunda Roewer, 1959 – Congo
Hogna karschi (Roewer, 1951) – São Tomé
Hogna kuyani Framenau, Gotch & Austin, 2006 – Australia
Hogna labrea (Chamberlin & Ivie, 1942) – USA
Hogna lacertosa (L. Koch, 1877) – South Australia
Hogna lambarenensis (Simon, 1910) – Congo
Hogna landanae (Simon, 1877) – West Africa, Angola
Hogna landanella Roewer, 1959 – Angola
Hogna lenta (Hentz, 1844) – USA
Hogna leprieuri (Simon, 1876) – Algeria
Hogna leucocephala (L. Koch, 1879) – Kazakhstan
Hogna levis (Karsch, 1879) – West, Central Africa
Hogna liberiaca Roewer, 1959 – Liberia
Hogna ligata (O. Pickard-Cambridge, 1869) – St. Helena
Hogna likelikeae (Simon, 1900) – Hawaii
Hogna litigiosa Roewer, 1959 – Angola
Hogna longitarsis (F. O. Pickard-Cambridge, 1902) – Mexico, Costa Rica, Panama
Hogna luctuosa (Mello-Leitão, 1947) – Brazil
Hogna luederitzi (Simon, 1910) – Namibia, South Africa
Hogna lufirana (Roewer, 1960) – Congo
Hogna lupina (Karsch, 1879) – Sri Lanka
Hogna maasi (Gertsch & Wallace, 1937) – Mexico
Hogna mabwensis Roewer, 1959 – Congo
Hogna maderiana (Walckenaer, 1837) – Madeira
Hogna magnosepta (Guy, 1966) – Morocco
Hogna maheana Roewer, 1959 – Seychelles
Hogna manicola (Strand, 1906) – Ethiopia
Hogna maroccana (Roewer, 1960) – Morocco
Hogna maruana (Roewer, 1960) – Cameroon
Hogna massaiensis (Roewer, 1960) – Tanzania
Hogna massauana Roewer, 1959 – Ethiopia
Hogna maurusia (Simon, 1909) – Morocco
Hogna medellina (Strand, 1914) – Colombia
Hogna miami (Wallace, 1942) – USA
Hogna migdilybs (Simon, 1886) – Senegal
Hogna morosina (Banks, 1909) – Costa Rica
Hogna munoiensis Roewer, 1959 – Congo
Hogna nairobia (Roewer, 1960) – Kenya
Hogna nefasta Tongiorgi, 1977 – St. Helena
Hogna nervosa (Keyserling, 1891) – Brazil
Hogna nigerrima (Roewer, 1960) – Tanzania
Hogna nigrichelis (Roewer, 1955) – Iran
Hogna nigrosecta (Mello-Leitão, 1940) – Argentina
Hogna nimia Roewer, 1959 – Tanzania
Hogna nonannulata Wunderlich, 1995 – Madeira
Hogna nychthemera (Bertkau, 1880) – Brazil
Hogna oaxacana (Gertsch & Wallace, 1937) – Mexico
Hogna ocellata (L. Koch, 1878) – Azerbaijan
Hogna ocyalina (Simon, 1910) – Namibia
Hogna optabilis Roewer, 1959 – Congo
Hogna ornata (Perty, 1833) – Brazil
Hogna osceola (Gertsch & Wallace, 1937) – USA
Hogna otaviensis (Roewer, 1960) – Namibia
Hogna pardalina (Bertkau, 1880) – Brazil
Hogna parvagenitalia (Guy, 1966) – Canary Islands
Hogna patens Roewer, 1959 – Zimbabwe
Hogna patricki (Purcell, 1903) – Southern Africa
Hogna pauciguttata Roewer, 1959 – Mozambique
Hogna persimilis (Banks, 1898) – Mexico
Hogna perspicua Roewer, 1959 – Ethiopia
Hogna petersi (Karsch, 1878) – Mozambique
Hogna petiti (Simon, 1876) – Congo
Hogna placata Roewer, 1959 – Lesotho
Hogna planithoracis (Mello-Leitão, 1938) – Argentina
Hogna posticata (Banks, 1904) – USA
Hogna principum (Simon, 1910) – Príncipe
Hogna propria Roewer, 1959 – Tanzania
Hogna proterva Roewer, 1959 – Congo
Hogna pseudoceratiola (Wallace, 1942) – USA
Hogna pseudoradiata (Guy, 1966) – possibly Morocco
Hogna pulchella (Keyserling, 1877) – Colombia
Hogna pulla (Bösenberg & Lenz, 1895) – East Africa
Hogna pulloides (Strand, 1908) – Ethiopia
Hogna radiata (Latreille, 1817) (type species) – Europe, Turkey, Caucasus, Russia (Europe to South Siberia), Kazakhstan, Iraq, Iran, Central Asia
Hogna raffrayi (Simon, 1876) – East Africa, Zanzibar
Hogna reducta (Bryant, 1942) – Virgin Islands
Hogna reimoseri Roewer, 1959 – Ethiopia
Hogna rizali Barrion & Litsinger, 1995 – Philippines
Hogna rubetra (Schenkel, 1963) – China
Hogna rubromandibulata (O. Pickard-Cambridge, 1885) – Yarkand, Karakorum
Hogna rufimanoides (Strand, 1908) – Peru, Bolivia
Hogna ruricolaris (Simon, 1910) – Botswana
Hogna sanctithomasi (Petrunkevitch, 1926) – St. Thomas
Hogna sanctivincentii (Simon, 1897) – Virgin Islands, St. Vincent
Hogna sanisabel (Strand, 1909) – Uruguay
Hogna schreineri (Purcell, 1903) – Namibia, South Africa
Hogna schultzei (Simon, 1910) – Namibia
Hogna senilis (L. Koch, 1877) – New South Wales
Hogna simoni Roewer, 1959 – Cameroon, Congo, Angola
Hogna simplex (L. Koch, 1882) – Mallorca
Hogna sinaia Roewer, 1959 – Egypt
Hogna snodgrassi Banks, 1902 – Galapagos Islands
Hogna spenceri (Pocock, 1898) – Rwanda, South Africa
Hogna sternalis (Bertkau, 1880) – Brazil
Hogna stictopyga (Thorell, 1895) – India, Myanmar, Singapore
Hogna straeleni Roewer, 1959 – Congo, Rwanda, Tanzania
Hogna subaustralis (Strand, 1908) – Peru
Hogna subligata (L. Koch, 1877) – Queensland
Hogna subtilis (Bryant, 1942) – Virgin Islands
Hogna suprenans (Chamberlin, 1924) – USA
Hogna swakopmundensis (Strand, 1916) – Namibia
Hogna tantilla (Bryant, 1948) – Hispaniola
Hogna taurirtensis (Schenkel, 1937) – Morocco
Hogna ternetzi (Mello-Leitão, 1939) – Paraguay
Hogna teteana Roewer, 1959 – Mozambique
Hogna thetis (Simon, 1910) – Príncipe
Hogna tigana (Gertsch & Wallace, 1935) – USA
Hogna timuqua (Wallace, 1942) – USA
Hogna tivior (Chamberlin & Ivie, 1936) – Panama
Hogna tlaxcalana (Gertsch & Davis, 1940) – Mexico
Hogna transvaalica (Simon, 1898) – South Africa
Hogna travassosi (Mello-Leitão, 1939) – Brazil
Hogna truculenta (O. Pickard-Cambridge, 1876) – Egypt
Hogna trunca Yin, Bao & Zhang, 1996 – China
Hogna unicolor Roewer, 1959 – Mozambique
Hogna vachoni Caporiacco, 1954 – French Guiana
Hogna variolosa (Mello-Leitão, 1941) – Argentina
Hogna ventrilineata Caporiacco, 1954 – French Guiana
Hogna volxemi (Bertkau, 1880) – Brazil
Hogna vulpina (C. L. Koch, 1847) – Brazil
Hogna wallacei (Chamberlin & Ivie, 1944) – USA
Hogna watsoni (Gertsch, 1934) – USA
Hogna willeyi (Pocock, 1899) – Bismarck Arch.
Hogna yauliensis (Strand, 1908) – Peru
Hogna zorodes (Mello-Leitão, 1942) – Argentina
Hogna zuluana Roewer, 1959 – South Africa

References

 

Lycosidae
Cosmopolitan spiders
Araneomorphae genera